Kuntur Wachana (Quechua for 'where the condor is born') is a Peruvian docudrama directed by Federico García Hurtado (born in Cusco, 1937). It was released in 1977. Kuntur Wachana won the FIPRESCI international critics' prize at the 10th Moscow International Film Festival.

Summary
Indigenous Peruvians led by Quechua peasant and trade union leader Saturnino Huillca struggle for land reform.

See also
Peru pre-land reform

References

External links
Kuntur Wachana at IMDB

1977 films
1977 drama films
Peruvian drama films
1970s Peruvian films
Quechua-language films
1970s Spanish-language films

Films about labour